Badbea is the ninth solo album by the Scottish singer-songwriter Edwyn Collins, released on 29 March 2019 on AED Records.

Track listing 
 "It's All About You" – 3:37
 "In the Morning" – 3:25
 "I Guess We Were Young" – 3:24
 "It All Makes Sense to Me" – 2:54
 "Outside" – 1:57
 "Glasgow to London" – 4:00
 "Tensions Rising" – 3:17
 "Beauty" – 2:48
 "I Want You" – 3:43
 "I'm OK Jack" – 2:57
 "Sparks the Spark" – 4:22
 "Badbea" – 4:27

References

Edwyn Collins albums
2019 albums
Albums produced by Edwyn Collins